Luiggy Llanos Cruz (born August 22, 1978 in Río Piedras, Puerto Rico) is a male  decathlete from Puerto Rico.

Biography
He set his personal best (7704 points) at the 2003 Pan American Games in Santo Domingo, Dominican Republic, where he claimed the silver medal.

Achievements

External links

sports-reference

1978 births
Living people
Puerto Rican decathletes
Athletes (track and field) at the 2004 Summer Olympics
Athletes (track and field) at the 2003 Pan American Games
Olympic track and field athletes of Puerto Rico
People from Río Piedras, Puerto Rico
Pan American Games medalists in athletics (track and field)
Pan American Games silver medalists for Puerto Rico
Medalists at the 2003 Pan American Games